Roger Tellart (9 March 1932 in Paris – 22 July 2013 id.) was a French musicologist and journalist, a specialist of Claudio Monteverdi, Heinrich Schütz, the madrigal and early music on which he published several works.

He was the father of viellist Christophe Tellart (Ensemble Perceval, Hespèrion XXI, Ensemble Réal, Poème Harmonique, etc.).

Biography 
Tellart wrote for the daily La Croix and musical magazines Diapason and Goldberg Magazine. He also wrote for the music magazines Classica, Concertclassic.com and La Lettre du musicien.

For a while, he was a producer at Radio France, where he was also invited several times to participate in programs on Baroque music. He was a frequent contributor to Radio Suisse Romande in programs dealing with early music.

Roger Tellart held the rank of Chevalier of the ordre des Arts et des Lettres and was a member of the Académie Charles-Cros.

Bibliography 
1964: Monteverdi, Seghers
1968: Schütz – Musiciens de tous les temps, Seghers
1997: Claudio Monteverdi, Fayard, (Grand prix de la critique 1997/1998)
2004: Le Madrigal en son jardin, Fayard

References

External links 
 Roger Tellart on Babelio
 Roger Tellart on La lettre du Musicien
 André-Modeste Grétry (1741-1813) by Roger Tellart on concertclassic.com
 Lully déchante aux Champs-Élysées by Roger Tellart on Altamusica 

20th-century French journalists
21st-century French journalists
20th-century French musicologists
21st-century French musicologists
French radio producers
Chevaliers of the Ordre des Arts et des Lettres
Writers from Paris
1932 births
2013 deaths